Aquarius is the debut studio album and fourth overall project by American singer Tinashe, released on October 3, 2014, by RCA Records. In 2011, after the disbandment of the girl group The Stunners, Tinashe announced that she would begin pursuing a solo career. The following year she released her debut mixtape In Case We Die. After raising her profile with the mixtape, Tinashe met with RCA Records where she subsequently signed a recording contract. Following her signing a record deal, Tinashe immediately began working on the album. During the recording process for the debut album, she released two other mixtapes, Reverie (2012) and Black Water (2013).

Aquarius was titled after Tinashe's zodiac sign. The album incorporates several genres including R&B, alternative R&B, and pop. The album's production was characterized as being synthetic, with atmospherics and minimalist beats and electronics. The album's composition drew comparisons to a variety of artists including The Weeknd and Aaliyah. Most of the songs were written by Tinashe herself, who also served as the album's executive producer alongside Mike Nazzaro.

Upon its release, Aquarius received generally positive reviews from music critics, who commended its production, lyrics, and themes, with reviewers comparing it to the work of Janet Jackson. The album debuted at number 17 on the US Billboard 200, selling 18,821 copies in its first week. It also charted in Australia, France and the United Kingdom. The album was promoted with the release of three singles—"2 On", "Pretend", and "All Hands on Deck"—with the first reaching number 24 on the Billboard Hot 100.

Background
In 2011, following the disbandment of the girl group The Stunners, Tinashe began pursuing her music career as a solo artist. In February 2012, it saw the release of her debut mixtape, In Case We Die. The mixtape was supported by singles, the first being as a promotional song "Chainless" which was released to iTunes on December 19, 2011. The mixtape also included the song "Boss", which was released as a free download on August 20, 2012, immediately after it was featured in an episode of the VH1 series Single Ladies.
In July 2012, Tinashe signed a deal with RCA Records. She subsequently released her second mixtape, Reverie, on September 6, 2012 through her official website. 
Tinashe sought to reintroduce herself creatively and artistically. She claimed that the album was an attempt to show fans who she is as an artist and additionally stated the album represents "a new season of music and art".

Recording

In 2013, Tinashe began work on her debut studio album. Recording sessions took place in Los Angeles, London, Atlanta, New York, and Toronto. Tinashe worked with several producers including Clams Casino, Ryan Hemsworth, Stuart Matthewman, Mike Will Made It, DJ Mustard, T-Minus, Boi-1da, Fisticuffs, Best Kept Secret, Ritz Reynolds and many more.
During an interview, Tinashe revealed that she had been recording and producing the album for two years, compared her mixtapes which she had created in a month, Tinashe compared the process with her album as being different due to working with other producers, during her mixtapes Tinashe made all the "decisions", but when recording the album she was working with other "creative people" and had to become "comfortable".
During the album recording Tinashe, recorded and produced at her home studio in her bedroom, where she produced some of the interludes included on the album, which she described as being "tighter" than her previous production.

During the album's recording, Tinashe avoided listening to music, so she was not heavily influenced by the work of other artists, stating she wanted the music to come from a "genuine place of inspiration." The guest verses provided by Schoolboy Q and ASAP Rocky were recorded separately and sent to Tinashe via email, however her collaboration with Future was recorded in the studio with him in Atlanta. Speaking about working with Future, Tinashe said, "I went to Atlanta and worked together on the song, and we wrote at the same time."
In December 2013, Tinashe revealed she had almost completed the recording of the album with nearly 100 songs being recorded at that point, she also revealed that she was at the final stages of the album's production, in which she was picking and choosing the album's final track listing as well as choosing "key songs" to fill the gaps. During the recording process of the album Tinashe recorded more than 100 songs.

Composition
Aquarius explores a variety of genres including R&B, alternative R&B, and pop. Dean Van Nguyen of NME described the album's music as a mix of The Weeknd's "decadent alt-R&B" and Aaliyah's "seductive cyber-pop". August Brown of the Los Angeles Times called the album's music "weird, wonderful world of experimental beat" which he compared to other PBR&B singers including FKA twigs and Kelela, continuing to say the album has rhythm and swing "yet cut through with melancholy." Andy Kellman of AllMusic described the album's musical style as being mostly "low-lit, slinking in tempo, and stitched together with several interludes", which Kellman described as being influenced by The Velvet Rope by Janet Jackson.
Dean Van Nguyen of NME noted the album's production for being "synthetic" and containing "[l]urid, crawling atmospherics led by beats and keys" along with "minimalism, thumping beats and electronics." Andy Kellman from AllMusic described the production as being "laced with small details, subtle twists, and gradual intensification." Sally-Anne Hurley from theMusic.com.au said the album "falls somewhere between mainstream, radio-friendly R&B and the electro, new-age alternative that's transformed the urban genre in a big way recently".

Songs
The album opens with the intro "Aquarius", which features a "spacey" production with a whispery soul aesthetic, followed by "Bet" which features Dev Hynes. "Bet" is a "mystical" with "ride-or-die" lyrics, that brushed off "haters". The song closes with Devonté Hynes performing a guitar outro.
"Cold Sweat" is a dynamic song that sees Tinashe observing fake friends and overall sycophancy that comes with stardom. The song's production "begins at a crawl before evolving into a pendulum of synths", followed by the album's first interlude titled "Nightfall".
"2 On" is an electronic R&B song, marking a slight departure from the murky alternative R&B from her mixtapes. The song features "effervescent keys", "synth-string accents", finger snaps, trap hi-hats, electro beats and distant chilly sighs. The song features a sample of Sean Paul's 2005 single "We Be Burnin'", with the line "Just give me the trees and we can smoke it ya/Just give me the drink and we can pour it ya" featured in the middle eight. Lyrically, the song is a carpe-diem anthem about being "super hyped up, super extra out on whatever emotion that it is."

"All Hands on Deck" is a crunk&B song. It comprises a thick bassline and a pan flute breakdown. Noted to be a shift from more sweet and coy-sounding tracks on Aquarius, Tinashe solicits a snarling technique in her vocal delivery, The song's lyrical content was noted to combine a dance instructional with the subject of caustic post-break-up stunting, namely in the lyric, "Kiss the old me goodbye / She's dead and gone". It portrays a scenario of a woman retaining her confidence and embracing her love life after a break-up.

Release and promotion
Promoting the album, Tinashe began performing the lead single "2 On". She first performed the song at SXSW Festival 2014. She also performed it at the Power 106 LA concert, Capital Xtra, Rinse FM, V100.7/Milwaukee's Family Affair, The Vipor Room and Hot 97's Who's Next. Drake also invited her onstage to perform the remix to the song in Houston.
Tinashe performed the song on The Wendy Williams Show on July 21, 2014. In October she performed it on Jimmy Kimmel Live. She also appeared on The Tonight Show Starring Jimmy Fallon and performed the single "All Hands on Deck" on Late Night with Conan O'Brien in April 2015.

In March 2015, Tinashe was announced as one of the opening acts for the North American leg of Nicki Minaj's The Pinkprint Tour, along with Meek Mill, Rae Sremmurd, and Dej Loaf. In September and October 2015, Tinashe toured South America with Katy Perry on The Prismatic World Tour. Tinashe's debut concert tour, the Aquarius Tour, visited North America, Europe, Oceania, and Asia.

Singles
"2 On", which features American rapper Schoolboy Q, was released on January 21, 2014 as the lead single from Aquarius. It impacted US rhythmic contemporary and urban contemporary radio on March 18, 2014. The song peaked at number 24 on the Billboard Hot 100, number 53 on the UK Singles Chart and spent four weeks atop the Billboard Rhythmic chart. On November 24, 2014, "2 On" was certified platinum by the Recording Industry Association of America (RIAA) for shipments of one million units.

The album's second single, "Pretend" featuring ASAP Rocky, was released on August 22, 2014. "All Hands on Deck" was sent to US urban contemporary radio on February 24, 2015, as the third and final single from the album.

Critical reception

Aquarius received generally positive reviews from music critics. At Metacritic, which assigns a normalized rating out of 100 to reviews from mainstream publications, the album received an average score of 80, based on 14 reviews. August Brown of the Los Angeles Times commented that the album "heralds an essential new voice, one that coheres 100 current ideas about women, sex, sadness and musical restlessness in one excellent album." John Kennedy of Billboard described the album as "a lustful listen that often centers on either coming together or breaking apart." Meaghan Garvey of Pitchfork wrote, "As [Tinashe has] shed the trappings of distinctly 2010s R&B for something less easily time-stamped, she's revealed a new and very telling set of inspirations, unmistakably the product of coming of age in the Y2K era of R&B, where Janet Jackson and Aaliyah gracefully countered choreography-happy, big-budget smashes with flashes of something darker and deeply personal." Andy Kellman of AllMusic remarked that "Tinashe's voice is almost always quiet and soft, yet her ability is considerable, and she packs a wide variety of approaches. Another indicator of potential here is that she is listed first as the co-writer of all but one of the songs."

At Rolling Stone, Julianne Escobedo Shepherd praised the album as "savvy" and "self-assured", stating, "Throughout, Tinashe's sweet soprano sets up a hazy mood that's easy to get lost in." Jabbari Weekes of Exclaim! called the album "solid" and concluded, "Although Aquarius may not rock the boat with innovation, it's more than confident in its stride, delivering an entertaining effort from the sultry singer." Steve Yates of Q noted that "Aquarius has its generic aspects—the creamy vocals, drifting tempos and woozy electronics—but Tinashe's voice is pure and malleable, her lyrics suggestive and assertive." Dean Van Nguyen of NME opined, "At 18 tracks, Aquarius may be overstuffed (the ambient interludes offer little) but it's an impressive statement that should elevate Tinashe far beyond the hype that has surrounded her mixtape releases so far." Despite criticizing Tinashe's "tendency to over-stuff her songs with lyrics that veer cringe-inducingly between being both super literal and super opaque", Aimee Cliff of Fact expressed that "Aquarius is quite a complicated and accomplished album in that it's amplified the potential of the mixtapes, making Tinashe into an unquestionable contender for real popstar status, without sacrificing the weirdo introspective soul that made them so special." In a mixed review, Slant Magazines Sal Cinquemani found Aquarius to be "remarkably consistent despite its myriad producers", but felt that "[t]oo much of the album [...] fails to live up to that standard", adding that Mike Will Made It's and Stargate's contributions "sound utterly generic when sandwiching more forward-minded tracks like 'Far Side of the Moon'".

Accolades

Commercial performance
Aquarius debuted at number 17 on the Billboard 200, selling 18,821 copies in its opening week. In its second week of sales, the album dropped to number 64 on the chart with 4,950 copies sold. The album also reached number two on the Top R&B Albums chart and number three on the Top R&B/Hip-Hop Albums chart. As of December 2015, Aquarius had sold 70,000 copies in the United States.

Track listing

Notes
  Despite not being credited as a songwriter of "Pretend" in the album's liner notes, Floyd Bentley is listed as a songwriter by BMI.
  signifies an additional producer
  signifies an executive producer
  signifies a co-producer
  "Vulnerable" was originally included on the 2013 mixtape Black Water

Sample credits
 "2 On" contains a sample from "We Be Burnin'" performed by Sean Paul.
 "How Many Times" contains a sample from "Funny How Time Flies (When You're Having Fun)" performed by Janet Jackson.
 "Pretend" contains a sample from "Action" performed by Orange Krush.

Personnel
Credits adapted from the liner notes of Aquarius.

Musicians

 Tinashe – vocals
 Julie Slick – additional instrumentation 
 Dominic Angelella – additional instrumentation 
 DJ Dahi – programming, keyboards 
 Blood Diamonds – programming, keyboards 
 Devonté Hynes – guitar 
 Schoolboy Q – vocals 
 Future – vocals 
 Sean Knotty – additional drums 
 ASAP Rocky – vocals 
 Mikkel S. Eriksen – all instruments, programming 
 Tor Erik Hermansen – all instruments, programming 
 Cashmere Cat – all instruments, programming 
 Roscoe Dash – background vocals 
 Mike Taylor – background vocals 
 Donna Missal – background vocals

Technical

 Ritz Reynolds – production ; recording ; mixing 
 Tinashe – recording ; production ; album production, executive production
 Erik Madrid – mixing 
 Vincent Vu – mixing assistance 
 DJ Dahi – production 
 Blood Diamonds – production 
 Boi-1da – production 
 SykSense – production 
 Sango – additional production 
 Jaycen Joshua – mixing 
 Ryan Kaul – mixing assistance 
 Maddox Chimm – mixing assistance 
 Dijon "DJ Mustard" McFarlane – production 
 Redwine – production 
 DJ Marley Waters – production 
 Legacy – production 
 Detail – production 
 The Order – production 
 Hector Delgado – mixing, recording (ASAP Rocky's vocals) 
 Gee Bizzy – mixing assistance, recording assistance (ASAP Rocky's vocals) 
 Stargate – production 
 Cashmere Cat – production 
 Mikkel S. Eriksen – recording 
 Miles Walker – recording 
 Phil Tan – mixing 
 Daniela Rivera – additional engineering for mix 
 Tim Blacksmith – executive production 
 Danny D. – executive production 
 Evian Christ – production 
 Jaime Velez – recording, engineering 
 Kevin "KD" Davis – mixing 
 Jeff Halsey – mixing assistance 
 Mike Will Made It – production 
 A+ – co-production 
 Stephen Hybicki – recording 
 Michel – production, engineering 
 Trevor Jerideau – album production
 Mike Nazzaro – album production, executive production
 Dave Kutch – mastering

Artwork
 Erwin Gorostiza – creative direction
 Maria Paula Marulanda – art direction, design
 Michael Schwartz – photography

Charts

Weekly charts

Year-end charts

Release history

Notes

References

2014 debut albums
Albums produced by Boi-1da
Albums produced by Cashmere Cat
Albums produced by DJ Mustard
Albums produced by Mike Will Made It
Albums produced by Detail (record producer)
Albums produced by Stargate
Albums produced by Vinylz
RCA Records albums
Tinashe albums